Kiana Angélica Palacios Hernández (born 1 October 1996) is a professional footballer who plays as forward for Liga MX Femenil side Club América. Born in the United States, she represents the Mexico women's national team.

College career
Palacios played for UC Irvine in her Collegiate career, converting from the defensive midfield to a forward, and essentially playing where the Anteaters needed her to be. She adjusted well and became the fourth leading scorer all time for UC Irvine with 24 goals. In her junior season, she at a point led the NCAA in goals scored and total team points before leaving for international duty for Mexico's U-20 team in 2016, two weeks before the collegiate regular season ended.

In her senior season, due to team injuries, she was put into the Central/Attacking Midfield position where she guided UC Irvine to the Big West regular season title; they were defeated in the Big West semifinals. Palacios received numerous collegiate accolades locally and nationally, in athletics and academics.

Club career
Palacios was selected in the fourth Round of the 2018 NWSL College Draft by Sky Blue FC, but was not signed.

She joined the LA Galaxy Orange County Women's squad in May 2018, competing in the United Women's Soccer League. The club is managed by her college coach from UC Irvine, Scott Juniper, and is designed to help collegiate players and recent graduates develop as professionals. She scored three goals in five matches.

On 13 July 2018, it was announced Palacios had signed a one-year contract with Spanish club Real Sociedad. On May 11, 2019 Palacios scored in the 19th minute in the 2018–19 Copa de la Reina de Fútbol to equalize against Atlético Madrid to assist Real Sociedad to its first title in a 2–1 victory.

International career
Palacios represented Mexico at the 2015 CONCACAF Women's U-20 Championship and the 2016 FIFA U-20 Women's World Cup. She made her senior debut on 4 February 2017 in a friendly match against Canada.

Palacios made her first senior team start on July 8, 2017 against Sweden and scored her first senior team goal on April 8, 2018 against the United States in her fifth recorded cap.

International goals

Honours

Club
Real Sociedad
 Copa de la Reina: 2018–19

References

External links
 
 
 
 
 

1996 births
Living people
Citizens of Mexico through descent
Mexican women's footballers
Women's association football forwards
Mexico women's international footballers
Pan American Games competitors for Mexico
Footballers at the 2019 Pan American Games
Primera División (women) players
Real Sociedad (women) players
Mexican expatriate women's footballers
Mexican expatriate sportspeople in Spain
Expatriate footballers in Spain
American women's soccer players
Soccer players from California
Sportspeople from Orange, California
American sportspeople of Mexican descent
UC Irvine Anteaters women's soccer players
NJ/NY Gotham FC draft picks
American expatriate women's soccer players
American expatriate sportspeople in Spain